Eldoret North Constituency was a former electoral constituency in Kenya. It was one of three constituencies in Uasin Gishu District, now Uasin Gishu County. The constituency was established for the 1966 elections.

Members of Parliament

Wards

References 

Constituencies in Rift Valley Province
Uasin Gishu County
Eldoret
1966 establishments in Kenya
Constituencies established in 1966
Former constituencies of Kenya